Euphorbia hyssopifolia, known by the common name of hyssopleaf sandmat in English and hierba de pollo ("chicken grass") in Spanish, is a member of the spurge family, Euphorbiaceae. It is an annual herb, native to Central and South America and the Southeastern United States. It has also been introduced to west Tropical Africa, India, and Australia.

References

hyssopifolia
Flora of the Southeastern United States
Flora of South America
Flora of Central America